This article is a list of notable domestic and international non-governmental organizations operating in the Islamic Republic of Pakistan.

A
 Aman Foundation
 ActionAid
 AED
 Al-Khair Foundation
 Adventist Development and Relief Agency Pakistan
 AFS Intercultural Exchanges
 American Himalaya Foundation
 Arab-Pakistani Fund
 Akhuwat Foundation
 Asian Human Rights Development Organization
 Association for the Development of Pakistan
 Aurat Foundation
 Aga Khan Rural Support Programme
 ACTED

B
 Bilqees Sarwar Foundation (BSF)
 Braille Without Borders
 Bremen Overseas Research and Development Association

C
 CARE Pakistan
 Caritas Pakistan
 Carter Center
 Centre for Social Justice Pakistan
 Childreach International
 Chiltan Adventurers Association Balochistan
 Clinton Foundation
 CMKP Pakistan
 Conservation International
 Consumer Rights Commission of Pakistan

D
 Darul Sukun
 David and Lucile Packard Foundation

E
 Edhi Foundation
 Environmental Defense
 Environmental Investigation Agency

F
 Faiz Foundation for Pakistan
 Family Educational Services Foundation
 Fatima Jinnah Trust
 Fauna and Flora International
 FHI 360
 Ford Foundation
 Friedrich Ebert Stiftung
 Friends of Pakistan
 Friends of the Earth Pakistan

G
 Green Crescent Trust

H

 Health Oriented Preventive Education (HOPE)

I

 Idara-e-Amn-o-Insaf
 Institute for Sustainable Communities
 International Committee of the Red Cross
 International Development Enterprises
 International Federation of Red Cross and Red Crescent
 International Fund for Animal Welfare
 International Organization for Sustainable Development
 International Republican Institute
 Islamic Relief
 Indus Hospital

J
 John D. and Catherine T. MacArthur Foundation
 JDC Welfare Organization

K
 Konrad Adenauer Stiftung

L
 Lahore Music Forum
 Layton Rahmatulla Benevolent Trust
 Khan Liaqat Ali Khan Society for Needy Children

M
 MKR Foundation
 Muslim Charity
 Muslim Hands
 Muslim World League
 Médecins du Monde
 Médecins Sans Frontières
 Minhaj Welfare Foundation

N

 National Democratic Institute for International Affairs
 Natural Resources Defense Council
 National Research and Development Foundation (NRDF)
 Nazaria-i-Pakistan Trust (NPT)

P
 Pacific Environment
 Plan International 
 Population Services International
 Prevention of Blindness Trust
 Program for Appropriate Technology in Health
 Progressive Education Network
 Project Hope
 ProLiteracy Worldwide

R
 Red Crescent Society
 Rising Sun Institute
 Rural Education and Development Foundation

S
 South Asia Partnership Pakistan
 Sada-e-Umeed
 Sarhad Rural Support Programme
 Save the Children
 Saylani Welfare International Trust
 SOS Kinderdorf
 Strengthening Participatory Organization
 Swiss Red Cross
 Shaukat Khanum Memorial Cancer Hospital & Research Centre

T
 Trust for Democratic Education and Accountability
 The Asia Foundation
 The Citizens Foundation
 The Dawood Foundation
 The Fred Hollows Foundation
 The Mountain Institute
 The Nature Conservancy
 The Salvation Army
 The Terma Foundation

V
 Volunteers in Asia
 Village Health Organization
 Voluntary Service Overseas

W
 War Against Rape
 Wetlands International
 Wheelchair Foundation
 WildAid
 Wildlife Conservation Society
 Women Media Center
 World Bank/International Monetary Fund
 World Conservation Union
 World Monuments Fund
 World Vision International
 World Wide Fund for Nature

Y
 Youth Parliament of Pakistan

References

NGO Pakistan